Stephanides is a Greek surname. It is a patronymic surname which literally means "the son of Stephanos", equivalent to English Stephenson.

Notable people with the surname include: 

Stephanos Stephanides (born 1951), Cypriot author, poet, translator and critic
Theodore Stephanides (1896–1983), Greek-British poet, author, translator, doctor, naturalist and scientist

Greek-language surnames
Surnames
Patronymic surnames
Surnames from given names